Alina Vera Savin (born 1 March 1988 in Bușteni) is a Romanian bobsledder who has competed since 2007. She finished 15th in the two-woman event at the 2010 Winter Olympics in Vancouver.

Savin's best World Cup finish is 19th in the two-woman event at St. Moritz in January 2010.

References
 

1988 births
Living people
Romanian female bobsledders
Bobsledders at the 2010 Winter Olympics
Olympic bobsledders of Romania
People from Bușteni
21st-century Romanian women